Victoria Lautman is a Los Angeles-based journalist, writer, and lecturer. Her focus is on art and culture, including architecture, design, and literature, particularly of India. Her book, The Vanishing Stepwells of India, was published by Merrell Publishers (London) in 2017.

Education 
Lautman received an M.A. in art history from George Washington University and a B.A. in anthropology and art history from the University of New Mexico.  She attended Merton College at Oxford University for archaeological field training, and following graduate school was employed by the Smithsonian Institution's Hirshhorn Museum and Sculpture Garden.

Career 
Lautman worked at the National Public Radio outlet in Chicago, WBEZ, beginning in 1984 as a weekly arts reviewer. During the next two decades, she founded and published a long-running arts and culture magazine, Artistic License, and then went on to be an interviewer and contributor to the station. In 2004, she moved to WFMT radio and created the Chicago author-interview series, Writers on the Record with Victoria Lautman, with authors including Junot Diaz, Edward P. Jones, Elizabeth Strout, Louise Erdrich, Frank McCourt, Michael Cunningham, Augusten Burroughs, Edwidge Danticat, Peter Carey, Anne Lamott, Martin Amis, Russell Banks, Richard Price, and Mary Gaitskill. Lautman's interviews with Jonathan Lethem, Lady Antonia Fraser, Amitav Ghosh, and others have also been heard at the Chicago Humanities festival.

As a print journalist, Lautman has written for a wide array of publications and was formerly the Chicago editor for the magazines Metropolitan Home, Art+Auction, Architectural Record, and House & Garden. 

Lautman became fascinated with the ancient subterranean step-wells of India after encountering one on her first trip to the country in the early 1980s. Decades later she pursued her interest in earnest, spending several months each year finding and photographing the dilapidated structures throughout the country. This body of work eventually led to the publication in 2017 of The Vanishing Stepwells of India (Merrell publishers, London). Subsequent exhibitions of her stepwell photographs have been mounted at The Fowler Museum at UCLA (2019) and The RMIT University Gallery in Melbourne (2018) Lautman has lectured widely on the topic throughout the United States and India. 

Lautman's earlier non-fiction book, The New Tattoo, was published by Abbeville Press in 1994.

External links
Official website

References

Year of birth missing (living people)
Living people
American radio personalities
Alumni of Merton College, Oxford
George Washington University alumni
University of New Mexico alumni